The women's heavyweight (70 kg/154 lbs) Low-Kick category at the W.A.K.O. World Championships 2007 in Belgrade was the second heaviest of the female Low-Kick tournaments, involving eight fighters from two continents (Europe and Africa).  Each of the matches was three rounds of two minutes each and were fought under Low-Kick rules.  

The tournament winner was Morocco's Amzail Bouchra who won gold by beating Russia's Elena Kondratyeva in the final by split decision.  Defeated semi finalists Natasa Ivetic from Serbia and Croatian Nives Radic had to make do with bronze medals.

Results

Key

See also
List of WAKO Amateur World Championships
List of WAKO Amateur European Championships
List of female kickboxers

References

External links
 WAKO World Association of Kickboxing Organizations Official Site

Kickboxing events at the WAKO World Championships 2007 Belgrade
2007 in kickboxing
Kickboxing in Serbia